Caecocypris basimi, the Haditha cavefish, is a species of cyprinid fish endemic to Iraq, only occurring in aquifers near Haditha.  This cavefish is the only member of its genus. The species is classed as Critically endangered, possibly extinct, by the IUCN, as there have been no records since 1983 despite a comprehensive survey in 2012. The primary threat is water extraction, which has lowered the groundwater level.

The cavefish Typhlogarra widdowsoni is found in the same place and it has also drastically declined, but it is not as rare as Caecocypris basimi. The only other known cavefish in Iraq is Eidinemacheilus proudlovei.

The holotype of Caecocypris basimi, collected by Dr. Basim M Al Azzawi in 1977, is deposited at the British Museum of Natural History and other specimens are at the Australian Museum.

References

Cyprinid fish of Asia
Fauna of Iraq
Cave fish
Monotypic fish genera
Taxonomy articles created by Polbot